Mayumi Ichikawa (born May 3, 1976) is a female long-distance runner from Japan. She set her personal best in the women's marathon on March 11, 2001 in Nagoya, clocking 2:27:22.

Achievements

References

1976 births
Living people
Japanese female long-distance runners
Japanese female marathon runners